Julia Solomonoff (born March 4, 1968, in Entre Ríos) is an Argentine film actress, producer, film and television director, and screenplay writer.

She lives in Buenos Aires and works in the cinema of Argentina and is a professor as well as the current Chair of the NYU Tisch School of the Arts Graduate Film Program in New York City.

Filmography

Director and writer
 Octavo 51 (1992)
 Un Día con Angela (1993)
 Siesta (1998)
 Scratch (2003)
 Hermanas (2005)
 The Last Summer of La Boyita (2009)
 Nobody's Watching (2017)
 Thirst (TBA)

Producer only
 Cocalero (2006)

Actor
 Historias Mínimas (2002) aka Minimal Stories

Television
 The Suitor (2001) (TV)
 Mujeres en rojo: Ahora (2003) (TV)

References

External links
 

Actresses from Buenos Aires
Argentine film actresses
Argentine film directors
Argentine women film directors
Argentine film producers
Argentine women film producers
Argentine screenwriters
Women screenwriters
Argentine Jews
Living people
1968 births
MacDowell Colony fellows